
Narаchanski (Narochansky) National Park  (Naračanski; , Naročanskij) is a national park in Belarus that is named after Lake Narach.

History 
Park was created on July 28, 1999, and covers an area of more than 87,000 hectares.

Park fauna 
Mammal species inhabiting in the park include the red deer, raccoon dog, European badger, marten, and otter; existing fish species include common bream, silver bream, and crucian carp. 
The national park also includes 218 other species of birds, such as the bittern, osprey and the common crane

See also
 List of national parks in the Baltics

References 

National parks of Belarus
1999 establishments in Belarus
Protected areas established in 1999